Laguna Quays is a coastal locality in the Mackay Region, Queensland, Australia. In the  Laguna Quays had a population of 68 people.

History 
In 1992, the Laguna Quays resort opened as a luxury resort. It had cost $250 million. A 70-berth marina opened in 1993. However, in 1995, the resort went bankrupt owing around $200 million. By 2009, the Mackay Regional Council was owed over $2 million for rates. It auctioned parts of the precinct to attempt to recover the money.
In 2013, Fullshare Holdings Group bought the resort announcing in 2015 they would refurbish and upgrade the facilities and dredge the marina.

The locality of Laguna Quays was officially named and bounded in September 1999.

In the  Laguna Quays had a population of 68 people.

Although the area is within the normal habitat range for crocodiles, its size and its proximity to people warranted its removal, noting that golf course ponds are attractive to crocodiles as a place of refuge, a source of food, and freshwater.

Geography
The waters of the Coral Sea form the eastern boundary.

References 

Mackay Region
Coastline of Queensland
Localities in Queensland